Ashvek Vintage World is a vintage car museum in South Goa, India. It describes itself as "Goa’s first and only vintage car museum and showroom."

Goals, background

It was set up in July 2004, and is the initiative of businessman Pradeep V. Naik (also spelt in some sources as Nayak). Its goal was to "spread awareness about vintage cars amongst the youth". Besides the preservation of vintage cars, it also takes to restoration work.

According to 40kmph.com the venture's owner Pradeep Nayak is a motorcycle dealer by profession, who got involved in the field after his uncle bought an old Mercedez car years ago. He later bought a Peugeot 301 (1931 make) for Rs 3000 in the year 1985, and the collection has since grown. Most of the cars have been got from nearby cities outside of Goa, such as Kolhapur, Sangli or Miraj, and a few were from the Maharaja of Sawantwadi in Maharashtra, located just outside the Goa border.

It has also been described as "dedicated to restore and preserve motoring and motorcycling gems of historical interest in Goa" and the price for entry to the Nuvem (Salcete)-based venture was Rs 50 in 2005.

Other events

The collection of vintage cars has also taken part in other events, for instance in auto expos. Vehicles listed as participating include "a convertible Chevrolet, convertible Morris 8, Morris 8 Saloon, Baby Austin, a very rare 4-door Morris Minor Pickup and the very special Volkswagen Beetle four-door limousine."

Models available

Among the models it currently has are the following:

1931 Peugeot
1948 Chevrolet Fleet Master
Rare two-engine Vandall tempo
1961 Datsun Fairlady
Morris 8
1939 Mercedes 170

Timings

It is open from 10 am to 1 pm, and from 3 pm to 5.30 pm, but closed on Sundays and other holidays.

Little known facts

Parts are occasionally got from auto-jumble sales in places as far away as the United Kingdom and Germany
Some vehicles from this vintage collection has been deployed in movies too
In April 2004, the team behind the museum organised a vintage car rally, and later, a Mercedes car rally
The owners say they care keen to buy old model cars and bikes if available on sale, specially those from around the 1930s or 1940s
'Goa: A Cultural Guide' that was compiled by Rudolf Ludwig Kammermeier also lists this centre among its cultural guide to Goa
Some cars that have been restored are hired out for weddings, shootings for movies or joy rides. It has organised vintage car rallies in Goa, and also undertakes restoration of vintage cars that belong to others. According to the official blog, a "1928 Ford belonging to Rauraje Deshprabhu of Pernem, as well as an attractive Austin belonging to Jaywant Chowgule are just some of the vehicles that have been restored here."

External links
Online blog of Ashvek Vintage World

Museums in Goa
2004 establishments in Goa
Buildings and structures in South Goa district
Museums established in 2004